Epanastasis canariensis is a moth of the family Autostichidae. It is found on the Canary Islands.

The wingspan is about 14 mm. The ground colour of the forewings is white with grey suffusion. The hindwings are brownish-grey.

References

Moths described in 1906
Epanastasis